A New Dimension is an album by jazz percussionist Willie Bobo recorded in 1968 and released on the Verve label.

Reception

AllMusic awarded the album 4½ stars.

Track listing
 "Psychedelic Blues" (Sonny Henry) - 6:15
 "The Look of Love" (Burt Bacharach, Hal David) - 4:18
 "Grazing in the Grass" (Philemon Hou) - 5:27
 "Quieres Volver" (José Feliciano, Nick Jiménez) - 3:54
 "Yellow Days" (Alan Bernstein, Álvaro Carrillo) - 3:50	
 "Lisa" (Sonny Henry) - 6:14
 "This Guy's in Love with You" (Bacharach, David) - 2:58
 "Sham Time" (Eddie Harris) - 5:48

Personnel
Willie Bobo - timbales
Jimmy Owens -  trumpet
Felix Wilkins, Stan Webb  - flute
Phil Bodner - flute, alto saxophone
Kenny Rogers - alto saxophone, tenor saxophone
Clarence Henry - guitar, arranger
Chuck Rainey - electric bass
Freddie Waits - drums
Jack Jennings, Osvaldo Martinez, Victor Pantoja, John Rodriguez - percussion
Unidentified string section arranged and conducted  by Don Sebesky (tracks 2, 4, 5 & 7)

References

1968 albums
Willie Bobo albums
Albums produced by Esmond Edwards
Albums arranged by Don Sebesky
Verve Records albums